The following is a list of events affecting American television during 1995. Events listed include television show debuts, finales, cancellations, and channel initiations, closures and rebrandings, as well as information about controversies and disputes.

Notable events

January

February

March

April

May

June

July

August

September

October

November

December

Programs

Programs debuting in 1995

Programs returning in 1995

Programs ending in 1995

Entering syndication in 1995

Programs changing networks in 1995

Milestone episodes and anniversaries

Made-for-TV movies and miniseries

Television stations

Station launches

Stations changing network affiliation

Births

Deaths

Television Debuts
Chris Kattan – NewsRadio
Darrell Hammond – Saturday Night Live
Ron Livingston – JAG
Cheri Oteri – Saturday Night Live
Will Ferrell – Saturday Night Live
Anthony Anderson – In the House
Michael Clarke Duncan – The Bold and the Beautiful
Anna Nicole Smith – The Naked Truth
Lee Evans – The World of Lee Evans
Mike Epps – Def Comedy Jam

See also
 1995 in the United States
 List of American films of 1995

Notes

References

External links 
List of 1995 American television series at IMDb

 
1990s in American television